Cautethia simitia is a species of moth in the family Sphingidae. It was described by Schaus in 1932. It is known from Colombia.

Adults are probably on wing in multiple generations and nectar at flowers.

The larvae probably feed on Rubiaceae species.

References

Cautethia
Moths described in 1932